Tai Sui is a Chinese term for the stars directly opposite the planet Jupiter ( Mùxīng) during its roughly 12-year orbital cycle. Personified as deities, they are important features of Chinese astrology, Feng Shui, Taoism, and Chinese Buddhism to a lesser extent.

The 12 signs of the Chinese zodiac are based on divisions of the Jovian orbital cycle, rather than—as with the western zodiac—the apparent motion of the sun relative to the celestial sphere. The star thought to oppose Jupiter during each year of the cycle was personified as a Heavenly General or Cycle God. These were believed to assist the Jade Emperor in controlling the mortal world.

In the Warring States period, Tai Sui had become gods in the popular astronomy, but there is no record of worshiping the Tai Sui in the documents before the Han dynasty, with the earliest record found in Wang Chong's Lunheng. There are several legends related to it, usually about people disrespecting or ignoring Tai Sui and suffering disaster.

Their number was later quintupled to sixty, based on the combinations of the twelve divisions (reckoned using the earthly stems) with the five Chinese elements of fire, earth, metal, water, and wood. Each of the gods' features and attributes signifies the well-being of that year. For example, if the Tai Sui of the year holds a pen, it signifies political unrest for that particular year. On the other hand, if the Tai Sui of the year holds a Spear or Sword, it signifies the need to work hard and excel for that year.

Yin Jiao is the leader of those sixty Taisui Xingjun gods. Yin Jiao doesn't govern any year in the 60-year cycle, and every year is governed by one of the 60 subordinate Taisui. Yin Jiao in particular is referred to in this context as Taisui Tongling Yin Yuanshuai (Commander of Tai Sui General Yin). In Japan and Japanese folklore however, "Taisui Xingjun" is considered a singular god.

Practices

In Taoism, those whose birth sign or other features clash with the Tai Sui of the year will face misfortunes or disturbances for the whole current year. Each year, this applies to people born under four out of the twelve animal zodiac signs. In 2017, for example, it applied to people born in the years of the Rat, Rabbit, Horse and Rooster. In Taiwan, people will go to the temples at the beginning of the Lunar Year, seeking protection and peace while driving away the negative impacts. The ritual or ceremony is known as "An Tai Sui" or pacifying the Tai Sui of the Year. In return, worshipers will receive a protective talisman from the temple which will give the person for one year's spiritual protection. This tradition is also practiced by other Overseas Chinese communities.

In Chinese culture it has been traditionally considered taboo to build a house facing Taisui (or in the directly opposite direction) in the corresponding year of the Chinese zodiac. A similar belief is associated with moving houses and the line drawn through the old and new dwellings.

Images of the Deities of the 60 Heavenly General of Tai Sui in correspondence to the previous detailed table above (refer to the Year number to Tai Sui and Heavenly General, e.g.: Year 1 –  Jiǎ-Zǐ Tài-Suì  Jīn Biàn Dà-Jiāng-Jūn)

See also
 Doumu (斗母元君)
 Sexagenary cycle
 Heavenly stems & Earthly branches
 Chinese folk religion

References

External links

Yearly Tai Sui sector list for Feng Shui
Yearly Tai Sui information – Indonesia language

Chinese astrology
Astronomy in China
Stellar groupings